Krzysztof Pomian (born 1934), is a Polish philosopher, historian and essayist. He is a professor of history at the Uniwersytet Mikołaja Kopernika (Nicolaus Copernicus University) in Toruń and, in 2001, was academic director of the (now closed) Museum of Europe in Brussels.

Pomian's specialization lies in the socio-cultural history of France, Italy, and Poland. He teaches as the dean of studies at the École des hautes études en sciences sociales and is an editor of the magazine Le Débat. Since 1968, he has also been a visiting professor at the University of Louvain (UCLouvain) in Louvain-la-Neuve, Belgium, where he lectures on the history of European societies.

Distinctions and honours 
 Honorary degree of the Maria Curie-Skłodowska University in Lublin (Poland) since 2003
Prize of the Foundation for Polish Science (2017)

Books 
   Collectionneurs, amateurs et curieux. Paris, Venise : XVIe-XVIIIe siècle. Paris, Gallimard, 1987,
 L'Ordre du temps, 1984
 La querelle du déterminisme : philosophie de la science d'aujourd'hui, 1990
 L'Europe et ses nations, 1990
 Sur l'histoire, 1999
 Des saintes reliques à l'art moderne : Venise-Chicago XIII–XX, 2003
 Ibn Khaldun au prisme de l'Occident, 2006

References 

1934 births
Living people
20th-century Polish historians
Polish male non-fiction writers
Academic staff of Nicolaus Copernicus University in Toruń
Academic staff of the Université catholique de Louvain

20th-century Polish philosophers
21st-century Polish philosophers
People associated with the magazine "Kultura"